Jane and Prudence is the third novel by Barbara Pym, first published in 1953.

Plot summary

Jane, a vicar's wife, lives a very different kind of life from her friend, the single and independent Prudence. Prudence has an imponderable attraction to her older and completely impervious employer, the head of an unspecified academic foundation. There is, however, competition for Fabian - Jessie Morrow, another spinster in the parish who seeks escape from her low-paid job as a companion to the domineering Miss Doggett.

Publication history and reception

Jane and Prudence was Pym's third novel, published by Jonathan Cape in 1953. Whereas Pym's first two novels had been successful, this received more mixed reviews. Literary figures Lady Cynthia Asquith and Lord David Cecil both championed the novel, but The Guardian felt it was "a horrid disappointment after Excellent Women" and the Times Literary Supplement remarked that the plot was "not easy to recall after one has closed the book". The novelist Jilly Cooper regards Jane and Prudence as Pym's finest work - "full of wit, plotting, characterization and miraculous observation". Throughout her life, Pym remained unhappy with the novel, commenting several times in her diary that she had not emphasised the "town and country" differences between the lives of the protagonists more effectively 

The novel did not sell particularly well; the initial bookshop orders from Cape totaled 2,300  and the publisher had sold 5,052 copies by the end of the 1950s. This meant that the book had made money, but was not a bestseller. Pym reported in 1954 that the publishers could attract no interest from American or Continental publishers. The book was first published in the United States in 1981, after Pym's death. 

The novel was released as an audiobook by Hachette in 2011, read by Maggie Mash.

Characters

Jane a good hearted Vicar’s wife in her 40th year
Nicholas, her mild mannered husband
Flora, their despairing teenage daughter
Prudence, aged 29, a beautiful and elegant spinster
Fabian, a vain and self-obsessed widower
Miss Doggett, a tyrannical old lady
Miss Morrow, her outwardly meek but calculating companion

Adaptations
Jane and Prudence was adapted for radio by Hilary Pym and Elizabeth Proud in 1993, with Julian Glover, Elizabeth Spriggs, Samantha Bond and Penelope Wilton among the cast.

A second radio adaptation was broadcast 2008, this time written by Jennifer Howarth.  Penelope Wilton was the narrator, Emma Fielding played Prudence and Susie Blake Jane. Miss Doggett was played by Elizabeth Spriggs.

Connections to other novels
Characters in Pym novels often reappear or are referenced in later works. The characters of Miss Morrow and Miss Doggett had originally appeared in an early unpublished work from 1940, Crampton Hodnet, which would be published after Pym's death. The character of Miss Morrow is distinctly different in Jane and Prudence, as is that of Barbara Bird, also re-used from Crampton Hodnet. The character of William Caldicote, from Pym's previous novel Excellent Women, appears very briefly late in this volume.

Footnotes

External links 
http://www.st-gabriels.com
http://www.barbara-pym.org

1953 British novels
Novels by Barbara Pym
Jonathan Cape books